Dean Gaskell, (born 12 April 1983) is a former Ireland international rugby league footballer.

Background
Gaskell was born in England, and he is of Irish descent.

Career
Gaskell played for the Widnes Vikings in National League One. He also played for Ireland.

Gaskell had previously played for the Leigh Centurions, and had Super League experience with the Warrington Wolves.

Dean Gaskell was successful with Widnes, in 2007 scoring 10 tries in 14 games.

Gaskell is an Ireland international, however he missed the winter programme and the games against Russia and Lebanon through injury.

He was named in the Ireland training squad for the 2008 Rugby League World Cup.

References

External links
(archived by web.archive.org) Widnes Profile
(archived by web.archive.org) Leigh Profile

1983 births
Living people
English people of Irish descent
English rugby league players
Ireland national rugby league team players
Leigh Leopards players
Rugby league wingers
Warrington Wolves players
Widnes Vikings players